Hiroko Hayashi may refer to:

, better known as Chikage Oogi, Japanese actress and politician 
, Japanese singer, actress and television personality